WAMS-LD, virtual channel 35 (UHF digital channel 29), is a low-powered television station licensed to both Minster and New Bremen, Ohio, United States. It is a translator of Lima-licensed Class A dual ABC/CBS affiliate WOHL-CD (channel 35) which is owned by Block Communications, and is also sister to Lima-licensed, full-powered dual NBC/Fox affiliate WLIO (channel 8). All of the stations share studios on Rice Avenue northwest of downtown; WAMS-LD's transmitter is located off SR 119 east of Minster.

History

The station signed on September 22, 1998 with the calls W65DP. It aired an analog signal on UHF channel 65 and was a full-time translator of WOHL-LP (now WOHL-CD). The channel was spun off in 2002 and became a CBS affiliate with the calls WLMO-LP while moving to UHF channel 38. This aired from a transmitter west of Cridersville in Auglaize County. Before the station affiliated with CBS, Dayton affiliate WHIO-TV served as the CBS affiliate of record for the Lima market, while Columbus affiliate WBNS-TV and Toledo affiliate WTOL served the eastern and northern portions of the market; some areas of the western portion of the market were also served by Fort Wayne affiliate WANE-TV.  After picking up CBS, WLMO fought an uphill battle with Time Warner Cable (now Charter Spectrum). The company initially refused to carry the station on its Lima system due to the presence of both WHIO-TV and WBNS-TV, the latter of which would replace WTOL-TV on most cable providers in the area.

With WLMO being a low-powered station with no support from any full-powered channels, Time Warner was not obligated to carry the station. Must-carry regulations do not apply to low-powered stations regardless of affiliation. However on March 29, 2006, Time Warner added the station to its systems in Lima, Cridersville, and Wapakoneta. At one point, this station carried America One on a secondary basis that was shared with WLQP-LP.

WLMO had applied to the Federal Communications Commission (FCC) to perform a "flash-cut" of its signal to digital in 2006. This application was dismissed as of July 1, 2009 because the station decided instead to apply for a low-power digital companion channel on UHF channel 47 with the calls WLMO-LD. On September 28, 2009, WLMO terminated its analog operations and programming was shifted to WOHL-CD's second digital subchannel.

On November 29, 2008, it was announced that Metro Video Productions would sell its stations (including WLMO) to West Central Ohio Broadcasting, a subsidiary of Block Communications (owner of WLIO). While Block assumed control of the station's operations after the sale's completion, it was initially stated that the company would not consolidate WLMO's facilities on South Central Avenue with WLIO. It has since been stated that some consolidation would take place with the station moving to WLIO's studios on Rice Avenue. On June 8, 2010, WLMO-LD was granted a construction permit. On June 10, to avoid automatic license termination, the FCC granted WLMO special temporary authority to restore analog service on channel 38. WLMO-LP's analog signal was restored on September 13.

On November 15, 2018, WLMO-LP's call sign was changed to WAMS-LP. By 2019, Block Communications had filed with the FCC to convert WAMS-LP into a digital translator of WOHL-CD for the southern part of the market, licensed to both Minster and New Bremen, Ohio, offering ABC and CBS programming over digital channels 29.5 and 29.6, virtually mapped to channels 35.1 and 35.2, respectively, in likely anticipation of the new July 13, 2021 low-power analog television shutdown date announced by the FCC on May 17, 2017. By March 2020, Block Communications commenced digital operations of this low-powered television station. WAMS-LP was obligated to convert to digital by July 13, 2021 as part of the Digital TV transition for low-powered TV stations. On March 2, 2020, the translator's call sign was changed to WAMS-LD.

Digital channels
The station's digital signal is multiplexed:

References

External links
HometownStations.com - Official Website

CBS network affiliates
Television channels and stations established in 1998
1998 establishments in Ohio
AMS-LP